List of Indian transfers for 2010-11 season.

AIFF XI

In:

Out:

Air India FC

In:

Out:

Chirag United

In:

Out:

Churchill Brothers

In:

Out:

Dempo SC

In:

Out:

East Bengal

In:

Out:

HAL

In:

Out:

JCT

In:

Out:

Mohun Bagan

In:

Out:

Mumbai FC

In:

Out:

ONGC

In:

Out:

Pune FC

In:

Out:

Salgaocar

In:

Out:

Viva Kerala

In:

Out:

External links/Source
https://web.archive.org/web/20110716215154/http://www.the-aiff.com/pages/content/index.php?action=document&id=17

https://web.archive.org/web/20100820150247/http://vivakerala.net/viva/transfers-2010.html

See also
 I-League

Transfers
India
2010–11